Çağla Korkmaz (born November 14, 1990) is a Turkish-German female football forward currently playing in the German 2. Bundesliga for 1. FC Lübars with jersey number 8. She is a member of the Turkey women's team.

Early life
Çağla Korkmaz was born to Turkish immigrant parents in Munich, Germany on November 14, 1990.

Playing career

Club
Korkmaz played for FC Stern München 1919 in the 2011–12 season bevor sie moved to FC Ingolstadt 04, where she scored eleven goals in 29 games of two seasons. Currently, she is part of 1. FC Lübars in the German 2. Bundesliga.

International

She was admitted to the Turkey women's team debuting in the friendly match against Georgia on February 24, 2015. .

References

External links
 Çağla Korkmaz at UEFA

1990 births
Footballers from Munich
German people of Turkish descent
German women's footballers
FC Ingolstadt 04 players
Turkish women's footballers
Turkey women's international footballers
Women's association football forwards
Living people
1. FC Lübars players